In commutative algebra, a Stanley decomposition is a way of writing a ring in terms of polynomial subrings.

Definition

Suppose that a ring R is a quotient of a polynomial ring k[x1,...] over a field by some ideal. A Stanley decomposition of R is a representation of R as a direct sum (of vector spaces)

 

where each xα is a monomial and each Xα is a finite subset of the generators.

See also

Rees decomposition
Hironaka decomposition

References

Commutative algebra